Aditya Arvind Waghmode (born 8 November 1989) is an Indian cricketer who plays for Baroda in domestic cricket. He is a left-hand opening batsman and off-break bowler. He made his first-class debut against Karnataka in the semi-final match of the 2010-11 Ranji Trophy.

References

External links 

Living people
Indian cricketers
Baroda cricketers
1989 births